Gustave Goublier (15 January 1856–27 October 1926), pseudonym for Gustave Conin, was a French composer of popular mélodies, notably Credo du paysan, La voix des chênes and L'Angélus de la mer. He was also orchestra conductor at the El Dorado, Parisiana, and Folies Bergère.

His younger son was the operetta composer Henri Goublier.

References

French composers
French male composers
Burials at Père Lachaise Cemetery
1856 births
1926 deaths